Craniophora sichuanensis is a moth of the family Noctuidae. It is found in China (Sichuan). The habitat consists of virgin mixed forests.

The wingspan is 32 mm.

Etymology
The species name refers to Sichuan Province, China, where the species was discovered.

References

Moths described in 2013
Acronictinae